Baldwin Lake may refer to:

Baldwin Lake (Los Angeles County, California)
Baldwin Lake (San Bernardino County, California)
Baldwin Lake (Anoka County, Minnesota)
Baldwin Lake (Illinois), Power Plant Cooling Lake
Baldwin Lake (Waterford Township, Michigan)

See also
Baldwin Hills Reservoir